The 1932 VPI Gobblers football team represented Virginia Agricultural and Mechanical College and Polytechnic Institute in the 1932 Southern Conference football season. The team was led by their head coach Henry Redd and finished with a record of eight wins and one loss (8–1).

Schedule

Players

Roster

Varsity letter winners
Eighteen players received varsity letters for their participation on the 1932 VPI team.

Season summary

Georgia

VPI Captain Bill Grinus blocked the tying extra point in the upset over Georgia.

at Alabama

Source:

Against the Crimson Tide of the University of Alabama, VPI lost 9–6 in front 11,000 spectators at Denny Stadium, which was the second largest crowd to ever visit the stadium at the time. VPI came into the game undefeated (6-0), while Alabama was 5–1. After a scoreless first quarter, the Gobblers took a 6–0 lead in the second after Ray Mills threw an 18-yard touchdown pass to Al Casey. In the third, the score was cut to 6–2 after a bad snap to Casey from the center resulted in a safety. Later in the quarter Alabama took a 9–6 lead that it held to the end of the game when halfback Dixie Howell scored a touchdown on a nine-yard run.

Alabama's assistant coach was former VPI player Hank Crisp.

References

VPI
Virginia Tech Hokies football seasons
VPI Gobblers football